MS Côte d' Albatre is a RO-RO passenger ferry currently operated by DFDS Seaways France between Newhaven in the UK and Dieppe in France and was originally built in 2006 for Transmanche Ferries which was then dissolved into LD Lines which then merged their channel interests with DFDS Seaways to form DFDS Seaways France, Cote D'Albatre has one sister ship which is the MS Seven Sisters which has previously operated between Portsmouth in the UK and Le Havre in France but joined Cote D'Albatre in Dieppe in 2015. She is also identical to several ships operated by Balearia in Spain and by Navairas ARMAS, also in Spain.

Ferries of France
2005 ships